Leslie Thomas Farrer (22 December 1922 – 16 November 2017) was an English footballer who represented Great Britain at the 1956 Summer Olympics. Farrer played as an amateur for Bishop Auckland and Walthamstow Avenue. Farrer died in November 2017 at the age of 94.

References

1922 births
2017 deaths
English footballers
Bishop Auckland F.C. players
Walthamstow Avenue F.C. players
England amateur international footballers
Footballers at the 1956 Summer Olympics
Olympic footballers of Great Britain
Association footballers not categorized by position
People from Hoddesdon